Nelson Mandela Road is a road in South Delhi, India. The road is one of the roads leading to Vasant Kunj from Vasant Vihar and Munirka. A section of the road is bound by Jawahar Lal Nehru University on one side.

It is named after Nelson Mandela, the first post-apartheid President of South Africa and an important leader in the fight against apartheid.

See also
Nelson Mandela
South Delhi
Vasant Kunj

References

Nelson Mandela
Streets in New Delhi